Athletics competitions at the 2011 Island Games in the Isle of Wight was held from June 26 to July 1 at the Fairway Sports Complex. The half marathon event was held on a double-loop circuit through the surrounding area.

Events

Medal table

Men

Women

References

Island Games
2011 Island Games
2011